Richard J. Mango (15 July 1912, Pennsylvania — 8 June 1975, Olmsted County, Minnesota) was an American bandleader, tenor saxophonist, vocalist, composer, and arranger originally from Detroit.  He led a well-known territory band — The Dick Mango Orchestra, booked by the Music Management Service of Omaha in the 1950s.  In the mid-1940s, he served in the US Army as a saxophonist and arranger.

Early years 
Mango began his professional career at age 16.  His family had moved to Detroit from Vandergrift, Pennsylvania, where he received his early musical training from his parents, both of whom were music teachers.  Before moving, he had attended Vandergrift High School in 1927-28 as a Freshman.  His first full-time job was with a traveling dance band, I. Fiscus and the Kiski Valley Blue Ribbon Boys, a popular east coast attraction.  He later played with Phil Brestoff, conductor of the Michigan Theater house band, and also had played with Benny Goodman, Artie Shaw, Johnny Long, and Ted Lewis.  He appeared in two films with the Lewis band:  Three Cheers for the Boys and Is Everybody Happy?.  During his tenure in the military, he organized dance bands and entertained the GIs.  Upon his return from the service, he started his own band.

Selected compositions and arrangements 
 You're the Answer, William S. Mango (Dick's brother; 1914–2001) & Richard J. Mango © Sept 14, 1944 (41433)

Former members of the Dick Mango Orchestra 
Bob  (Robert) Biegler(born 19 - trumpet and trombone
 Annie Maloney (married and divorced three times, but kept the surname Shedron; 1928–1997) — vocalist
 Bob Olsen (né Robert George Olsen; born 1929) — trumpet
 Herbie Phillips (1935–1995) — trumpet
 Lou Milotte II (né Louis Henry Milotte; born 1934) — fifth sax (baritone & alto) 1951–1952
 William R. Cassidy (1923–1983) — trumpet in 1950s
 Jeffrey Lowell—trombone (needs confirmation)

References 

American jazz saxophonists
American male saxophonists
1912 births
1975 deaths
20th-century American saxophonists
20th-century American male musicians
American male jazz musicians